The Danville News is a newspaper published in Sunbury, Pennsylvania.

The publication is owned by Community Newspaper Holdings Inc., a company founded in 1997 by Ralph Martin. CNHI newspapers are clustered in groups that cross-sell packages to advertisers and occasionally feature editorial content written by a regional reporter working directly for CNHI.

References

External links
 CNHI Website

Newspapers published in Pennsylvania
Publications with year of establishment missing